The Low Cost Autonomous Attack System (LOCAAS) was a loitering attack munition developed for the United States Air Force (USAF). In 1998 the USAF and U.S. Army Lockheed Martin began to examine the feasibility of a small, affordable cruise missile weapon for use against armoured and unarmoured vehicles, materiel and personnel, and if so develop a demonstration program. The program cost approximately $150,000,000; the cost per unit was calculated to be $30,000 based on a production of 12,000 units before cancellation.

After being launched from a weapon platform, it is guided by GPS/INS to the target general area, where it can loiter. A laser radar (LIDAR or LADAR) illuminates the targets, determines their range, and matches their 3-D geometry with pre-loaded signatures. The LOCAAS system then selects the highest priority target and selects the warhead's mode for the best effect.

It was part of the Small Bomb System (SBS) program.  The LOCAAS has been cancelled.

Specifications
 Weight: 
 Length: 
 Speed: 
 Search altitude: 
 Footprint: 
 Motor:  thrust class turbojet.
 Range: >
 Loiter time: 30 min max.
 Guidance: GPS/INS with LADAR terminal seeker
 Warhead: 7.7 kg (17 lb) multi-mode explosively formed projectile (long rod penetrator, aerostable slug or fragmentation)

See also
 Vertical Launch Autonomous Attack System (VLAAS)
 Surveilling Miniature Attack Cruise Missile
 GBU-53/B Small Diameter Bomb II

References

External links
 Low Cost Autonomous Attack System - Defense Update
 LOCAAS-Deagel

Cruise missiles of the United States
Ammunition